NeoOffice is an office suite for the macOS operating system developed by Planamesa Inc. It is a commercial fork of the free and open source LibreOffice office suite, including a word processor, spreadsheet, presentation program and graphics program, it adds some features not present in the macOS versions of LibreOffice and Apache OpenOffice. Current versions are based on LibreOffice 4.4 which was released mid-2014.

History 
Versions of OpenOffice.org for Mac prior to 3.0 did not have a native Mac OS X interface; they required that either X11.app or XDarwin be installed.

NeoOffice was the first OpenOffice.org fork to offer a native Mac OS X experience, with easier installation, better integration into the Mac OS X interface (pull-down menus at the top of the screen and familiar keyboard shortcuts, for example), use of Mac OS X's fonts and printing services without additional configuration, and integration with the Mac OS X clipboard and drag-and-drop functions. Subsequently, both LibreOffice and Apache OpenOffice followed NeoOffice's lead and implemented similarly native Mac OS X interfaces.

NeoOffice began as a project to investigate methods of creating a native port of OpenOffice.org to Mac OS X. The project now called NeoOffice was originally dubbed "NeoOffice/J", reflecting its use of Mac OS X's Java integration to enable a native application. A related project was NeoOffice/C, which was a simultaneous effort to develop a version using Apple's Cocoa APIs. But NeoOffice/C proved very difficult to implement and the application was highly unstable, so the project was set aside in favor of the more promising NeoOffice/J. The "/J" suffix was dropped with version 1.2, since there was no longer another variety of NeoOffice from which to distinguish it. Many of these releases were preceded by a version that only Early Access Members could download; these versions were released about a month before the official release date.

All versions from NeoOffice 3.1.1 to NeoOffice 2015 were based on OpenOffice.org 3.1.1, though latter versions included stability fixes from LibreOffice and Apache OpenOffice. NeoOffice 2017 and later versions are fully based on LibreOffice.

In 2013, NeoOffice moved to a commercial distribution model via the Mac App Store. As of 2016, the source code is still available for free, but the software package was only available with the purchase of a commercial license. This has changed in 2022 as the code and all commits are released on GitHub. Moreover, the whole application is free of charge.

Supported file formats 
Listed here, in the order of appearance in the Save As dialogue box, are the  file formats supported for saving documents in NeoOffice 3.1.2. In cases where NeoOffice is used to edit a document originally in a Microsoft format, NeoOffice can save to that format without loss of formatting.

Word processor application 
 OpenDocument Text (.odt) *
 OpenDocument Text Template (.ott)
 NeoOffice 1.0 Text Document (.sxw)
 NeoOffice 1.0 Text Document Template (.stw)
 Microsoft Word 97/2000/XP (.doc)
 Microsoft Word 95 (.doc)
 Microsoft Word 6.0 (.doc)
 Rich Text Format (.rtf)
 StarWriter 5.0 (.sdw)
 StarWriter 5.0 Template (.vor)
 StarWriter 4.0 (.sdw)
 StarWriter 4.0 Template (.vor)
 StarWriter 3.0 (.sdw)
 StarWriter 3.0 Template (.vor)
 Text (.txt)
 Text Encoded (.txt)
 HTML Document (NeoOffice Writer) (.html)
 AportisDoc (Palm) (.pdb)
 DocBook (.xml)
 Microsoft Word 2007 XML (.docx)
 Microsoft Word 2003 XML (.xml)
 OpenDocument Text (Flat XML) (.fodt)
 Pocket Word (.psw)
 Unified Office Format text (.uot)

Spreadsheet application 
 OpenDocument Spreadsheet (.ods) *
 OpenDocument Spreadsheet Template (.ots)
 NeoOffice 1.0 Spreadsheet (.sxc)
 NeoOffice 1.0 Spreadsheet Template (.stc)
 Data Interchange Format (.dif)
 dBase (.dbf)
 Microsoft Excel 97/2000/XP (.xls)
 Microsoft Excel 97/2000/XP Template (.xlt)
 Microsoft Excel 95 (.xls)
 Microsoft Excel 95 Template (.xlt)
 Microsoft Excel 5.0 (.xls)
 Microsoft Excel 5.0 Template (.xlt)
 StarCalc 5.0 (sdc)
 StarCalc 5.0 Template (.vor)
 StarCalc 4.0 (.sdc)
 StarCalc 4.0 Template (.vor)
 StarCalc 3.0 (.sdc)
 StarCalc 3.0 Template (.vor)
 SYLK (.slk)
 Text CSV (.csv)
 HTML Document (NeoOffice Calc) (.html)
 Microsoft Excel 2007 XML (.xlsx)
 Microsoft Excel 2003 XML (.xml)
 OpenDocument Spreadsheet (Flat XML) (.fods)
 Pocket Excel (.pxl)
 Unified Office Format spreadsheet (.uos)

Presentation application 
 OpenDocument Presentation (.odp) *
 OpenDocument Presentation Template (.otp)
 NeoOffice 1.0 Presentation (.sxi)
 NeoOffice 1.0 Presentation Template (.sti)
 Microsoft PowerPoint 97/2000/XP (.ppt)
 Microsoft PowerPoint 97/2000/XP Template (.pot)
 NeoOffice 1.0 Drawing (NeoOffice Impress) (.sxd)
 StarDraw 5.0 (NeoOffice Impress) (.sda)
 StarDraw 5.0 (NeoOffice Impress) (.sdd)
 StarImpress 5.0 (.sdd)
 StarImpress 5.0 Template (.vor)
 StarImpress 4.0 (.sdd)
 StarImpress 4.0 Template (.vor)
 Microsoft PowerPoint 2007 XML (.pptx)
 OpenDocument Presentation (Flat XML) (.fodp)
 Unified Office Format presentation (.uop)
 OpenDocument Drawing (Impress) (.odg)

Graphics application 
 OpenDocument Drawing (.odg) *
 OpenDocument Drawing Template (.otg)
 NeoOffice 1.0 Drawing (.sxd)
 NeoOffice 1.0 Drawing Template (.std)
 StarDraw 5.0 (.sda)
 StarDraw 5.0 Template (.vor)
 StarDraw 3.0 (.sdd)
 StarDraw 3.0 Template (.vor)
 OpenDocument Drawing (Flat XML) (.fodg)

Database application 
 OpenDocument Database (.odb) *

Formula application 
 OpenDocument Formula (.odf) *
 NeoOffice 1.0 Formula (.sxm)
 StarMath 5.0 (.smf)
 MathML 1.01 (mml)

(*Pre-chosen save default format.) 
By default, NeoOffice loads and saves files in the OpenDocument file format, although this can be changed by the user. The OpenDocument file format is an XML file format standardized by OASIS (Organisation for the Advancement of Structured Information Standards).

Licensing 

Sun first released OpenOffice.org under both the LGPL and SISSL, later under only the LGPL, with a requirement for copyright assignment for any contributions to the main code base, which allowed Sun to create proprietary versions of the software (notably StarOffice). NeoOffice chose not to assign its code to Sun, which prevented Sun from using NeoOffice code in official OpenOffice.org versions.

There were initially some attempts to resolve the licensing differences and foster more direct cooperation and code-sharing between the NeoOffice and OpenOffice.org developers. However, the NeoOffice developers said that they preferred to work separately from OpenOffice.org because "coordination requires a significant amount of time." The OpenOffice.org developers said that "a proposal to work together has been made, and NeoOffice developers refused". The NeoOffice developers subsequently expressed support for LibreOffice and the launch of The Document Foundation.

Though NeoOffice is sold commercially, the source code is still available for free under the terms of the GPL.

See also 

 List of word processors
 Comparison of word processors

References

External links 
 
 NeoWiki

MacOS-only free software
Office suites for macOS
Open-source office suites
OpenOffice
Software forks
Office suites
Spreadsheet software